The Progressive List for Peace (HaReshima HaMitkademet LeShalom) was a left-wing political party in Israel. The party was formed from an alliance of both Arab and Jewish left-wing activists.

History
The party was formed in 1984 by a merger of the Jewish Alternativa movement, the Nazareth-based Progressive Movement, as well as other individuals. It contested the 1984 Knesset elections, winning two seats, taken by Mohammed Miari and Mattityahu Peled.

Attempted banning
In 1985, the Basic Law dealing with the Knesset was amended to add section 7a, "Prevention of Participation of Candidates List." This provision included:

A candidates' list shall not participate in elections to the Knesset if its objects or actions, expressly or by implication, include one of the following ... negation of the existence of the State of Israel as the state of the Jewish people.

The primary motivation for this amendment was to outlaw racist parties such as Kach, whose members had been involved in terrorism. However, to provide what was viewed as balance, the authors also sought to outlaw left-wing parties which they viewed as threatening the Jewish character of the state of Israel.

Although it is unclear exactly what might constitute "negation of the State of Israel as the state of the Jewish people", conceivably positions such as support for the one-state solution—creating a single state in Israel the West Bank and Gaza Strip, both Jewish and Arab—or support for granting Arabs the same rights to settle in Israel which Jews enjoy, might be included.

On 17 June 1988 prior to the 1988 elections, the Central Elections Committee used this provision as a justification for banning the Progressive List for Peace from running in the election. The party appealed to the Supreme Court, which overruled the Central Elections Committee decision and permitted the PLP to run in the election. However, the Supreme Court did not overturn section 7(a): it merely held that the policies of the PLP did not fall under it.

According to the brief presented by Yossi Bard, himself a prominent member of the party, the PLP did not dispute the Jewish character of Israel, but asserted that that character must be interpreted as subject to Israel being a democracy—i.e., the Jewish character of Israel could not mean any discrimination against non-Jewish citizens, since such discrimination would by definition mean that Israel was not a democracy. Rather, the PLP held that since the majority of Israeli citizens were Jews, their culture and traditions would naturally greatly influence the overall culture of the country, and the PLP had no objection to that.

The Kach lawyers presented what they claimed was a kind of "mirror image brief", in which they asserted that Kach had no objection to the democratic character of Israel, but asserted that that character must be interpreted as subject to Israel being a Jewish State—i.e., the democratic character of Israel could not mean any infringement of the pre-eminent position of Jews in all spheres of Israeli life, since such infringement would mean that Israel was not a Jewish state (at least, not what Kach regarded as "a Jewish state"). Rather, Kach held that it had no objection to state officials being elected in free elections and that political parties and organizations be granted freedom of speech, as long as political and economic power was kept exclusively in the hands of Jews.

The Supreme Court broke the "symmetry" by accepting the PLP brief and rejecting that of Kach, that overturning the banning of the former and upholding that of latter. That ruling created a milestone precedent in Israeli constitutional jurisprudence by establishing that supporting equal rights for Israeli Arabs does not consist of denying Israel's character as a Jewish democratic state, while opposing equality for Israeli Arabs is a violation.

Adam Keller court martial
In April 1988, Adam Keller, the PLP Spokesperson, was arrested by military police while on a term of the reserve military duty obligatory to all Israeli Jewish males. He was charged with having written graffiti on 117 tanks and other military vehicles, exhorting soldiers to refuse service in the Occupied Territories, and with having taken down the standing orders from a military billboard and replaced them with PLP leaflets expressing "anger and protest" at "the systematic killing of Palestinian unarmed demonstrators" and calling for "the creation of an independent Palestinian state, side-by-side with Israel". Keller admitted the acts attributed to him and actually took pride in them and declared them to be praiseworthy rather than a criminal offence. Both under interrogation and at his trial, Keller repeatedly reiterated that he had acted completely alone, without any involvement by other members of the party or of the party as such, that the PLP leaflets were left over in his bag from a meeting which he attended on the night before his call-up order, and that he had not brought them to the army with any premeditated intention of exposing soldiers to them but rather had placed them on the military billboard as a sudden reaction to radio news of especially harsh acts of oppression by soldiers on the West Bank.

Keller's testimony on this was accepted, and no legal steps were taken against any other members of the PLP or against the party as a whole, though some right-wing columnists and politicians urged such steps to be taken. However, Keller's wife Beate Zilversmidt was received with a standing ovation at the PLP's conference, held in Nazareth during the second month of his incarceration, and the party members—even though not consulted in advance—clearly approved of his act.

Decline
In the November 1988 Knesset elections the party won only one seat, taken by Miari. Prior to the 1992 elections the electoral threshold was raised to 1.5%. The PLP won only 0.9% of the vote, losing its Knesset representation.

Historical perspective

In a meeting held in Tel Aviv on April 22, 1994, to mark ten years since the formation of the PLP, the party's former spokesperson Adam Keller stated:

References

1984 establishments in Israel
1990s disestablishments in Israel
Arab political parties in Israel
Defunct political parties in Israel
Left-wing politics in Israel
Political parties disestablished in the 1990s
Political parties established in 1984
Political parties with year of disestablishment missing